"The Different Story (World of Lust and Crime)" is a song by Peter Schilling from the album of the same name.  The song was produced by Michael Cretu, and was released on 25 October 1988.

The song contains female vocals by Susanne Müller-Pi along with boisterous singing from Schilling himself.

Charts 
While the video was a top ten pop hit in Sweden, the album from which it came did not fare as well likely due to the previously released tracks on the album.  The song did however, reach No. 16 on the Billboard Dance chart and was his most recent pop hit in the United States, reaching No. 61 on the Hot 100 in 1989.

Video 
The video portrays Schilling on horseback, with Müller-Pi dancing and singing in a white dress.

References 

1989 singles
Peter Schilling songs
1989 songs